= Heritage365 =

Heritage365 (formerly known as New Heritage) was a professional magazine for the cultural heritage sector, especially museums. The magazine was founded in 2003. It was published by Heritage Development Ltd., based in Milton Keynes, England.
